Estrangeirados were, in the history of Portugal, Portuguese intellectuals who, in the late 17th century and particularly in the 18th century, strove to introduce the ideas of the Scientific Revolution and the Enlightenment, as well as other foreign ideas to Portugal.

Etymology 
Estrangeirado (meaning "admirer, cultivator of what is foreign") comes from the Portuguese estrangeiro, meaning foreign. This is because the ideas these people tried to inculcate in Portuguese society were, for the most part, foreign in origin.

Estrangeirados 
Luís da Cunha
Luís António Verney
Alexandre de Gusmão
Félix Avelar Brotero
Jacob de Castro Sarmento
Sebastião José de Carvalho e Melo, 1st Marquis of Pombal
António Nunes Ribeiro Sanches

References

Science and technology in Portugal
18th century in Portugal
17th century in Portugal